The Bristol Hercules is a 14-cylinder two-row radial aircraft engine designed by Sir Roy Fedden and produced by the Bristol Engine Company starting in 1939. It was the most numerous of their single sleeve valve (Burt-McCollum, or Argyll, type) designs, powering many aircraft in the mid-World War II timeframe.

The Hercules powered a number of aircraft types, including Bristol's own Beaufighter heavy fighter design, although it was more commonly used on bombers.  The Hercules also saw use in civilian designs, culminating in the 735 and 737 engines for such as the Handley Page Hastings C1 and C3 and Bristol Freighter. The design was also licensed for production in France by SNECMA.

Design and development
Shortly after the end of World War I, the Shell company, Asiatic Petroleum, commissioned Harry Ricardo to investigate problems of fuel and engines. His book was published in 1923 as “The Internal Combustion Engine”. Ricardo postulated that the days of the poppet valve were numbered and that a sleeve valve alternative should be pursued.

The rationale behind the single sleeve valve design was two-fold: to provide optimum intake and exhaust gas flow in a two-row radial engine, improving its volumetric efficiency and to allow higher compression ratios, thus improving its thermal efficiency. The arrangement of the cylinders in two-row radials made it very difficult to utilise four valves per cylinder, consequently all non-sleeve valve two- and four-row radials were limited to the less efficient two-valve configuration. Also, as combustion chambers of sleeve-valve engines are uncluttered by valves, especially hot exhaust valves, so being comparatively smooth they allow engines to work with lower octane number fuels using the same compression ratio. Conversely, the same octane number fuel may be utilised while employing a higher compression ratio, or supercharger pressure, thus attaining either higher economy or power output. The downside was the difficulty in maintaining sufficient cylinder and sleeve lubrication.

Manufacturing was also a major problem. Sleeve valve engines, even the mono valve Fedden had elected to use, were extremely difficult to make. Fedden had experimented with sleeve valves in an inverted V-12 as early as 1927 but did not pursue that engine any further. Reverting to nine cylinder engines, Bristol had developed a sleeve valve engine that would actually work by 1934, introducing their first sleeve-valve designs in the 750 horsepower (560 kW) class Perseus and the 500 hp (370 kW) class Aquila that they intended to supply throughout the 1930s. Aircraft development in the era was so rapid that both engines quickly ended up at the low-power end of the military market and, in order to deliver larger engines, Bristol developed 14-cylinder versions of both. The Perseus evolved into the Hercules, and the Aquila into the Taurus.

These smooth-running engines were largely hand-built, which was incompatible with the needs of wartime production. At that time, the tolerances were simply not sufficiently accurate to ensure the mass production of reliable engines. Fedden drove his teams mercilessly, at both Bristol and its suppliers, and thousands of combinations of alloys and methods were tried before a process was discovered which used centrifugal casting to make the sleeves perfectly round. This final success arrived just before the start of the Second World War.

In 1937 Bristol acquired a Northrop Model 8A-1, the export version of the A-17 attack bomber, and modified it as a testbed for the first Hercules engines.

The first Hercules engines were available in 1939 as the 1,290 hp (960 kW) Hercules I, soon improved to 1,375 hp (1,025 kW) in the Hercules II. The major version was the Hercules VI which delivered 1,650 hp (1,230 kW), and the late-war Hercules XVII produced 1,735 hp (1,294 kW).

In 1939 Bristol developed a modular engine installation for the Hercules, a so-called "power-egg", allowing the complete engine and cowling to be fitted to any suitable aircraft.

A total of over 57,400 Hercules engines were built.

Applications

Note:
Armstrong Whitworth Albemarle
Avro Lancaster B.II
Avro York C.II
Bristol Beaufighter
Bristol Freighter
Bristol Superfreighter
Breguet 890 Mercure
CASA C-207 Azor
Fokker T.IX
Folland Fo.108
Handley Page Halifax
Handley Page Hastings
Handley Page Hermes
Nord Noratlas
Northrop 8A (One Swedish 8A-1 was bought by Bristol to test the engine)
Northrop Gamma 2L
Saro Lerwick
Short S.26
Short Seaford
Short Solent
Short Stirling
Vickers Valetta
Vickers Varsity
Vickers VC.1 Viking
Vickers Wellesley
Vickers Wellington

Specifications (Hercules II)

See also

References

Notes

Bibliography

Gunston, Bill. (1993) The Development of Piston Aero Engines, Haynes Publishing, Somerset 
Gunston, Bill. (1995) Classic World War II Aircraft Cutaways. Osprey. 
Gunston, Bill. World Encyclopedia of Aero Engines: From the Pioneers to the Present Day. 5th edition, Stroud, UK: Sutton, 2006. 
Lumsden, Alec. British Piston Engines and Their Aircraft. Marlborough, UK: Airlife Publishing, 2003. .
White, Graham. Allied Aircraft Piston Engines of World War II: History and Development of Frontline Aircraft Piston Engines Produced by Great Britain and the United States During World War II. Warrendale, Pennsylvania: SAE International, 1995.

External links

 Running a Hercules for the first time in 30 years
 Image of the gear system for the sleeve drive
"Safety through engine development testing" a 1948 advert for the Hercules in Flight magazine
"600 Hours between overhaul" a 1948 Flight advertisement for the Hercules

Hercules
Aircraft air-cooled radial piston engines
Sleeve valve engines
1930s aircraft piston engines